Carleton G. Howe (March 4, 1898 – September 21, 1993) was a Vermont orchardist and politician who served as President of the Vermont State Senate.

Biography
Carleton Gibson Howe was born in Cañon City, Colorado on March 4, 1898.  He was raised in Chicago, Illinois and served in the United States Navy during World War I.

In 1922 Howe graduated from the University of Illinois.  Howe settled in Dorset, Vermont, where he owned and operated a successful apple growing business.

A Republican, Howe served in the Vermont House of Representatives from 1945 to 1947.  In 1946 he won election to the Vermont Senate, where he served from 1947 to 1959.  From 1955 to 1957 Howe served as Senate President.  Howe ran unsuccessfully for renomination to the State Senate in 1958.

Howe was a Delegate to the 1952 Republican National Convention, and he was an alternate delegate in 1956.  In the late 1950s he served as Chairman of the Vermont Republican Party.

Howe died in Manchester on September 21, 1993.  His remains were cremated.

References 

1898 births
1993 deaths
American orchardists
People from Cañon City, Colorado
Politicians from Chicago
People from Dorset, Vermont
University of Illinois alumni
United States Navy personnel of World War I
Republican Party Vermont state senators
Presidents pro tempore of the Vermont Senate
Farmers from Vermont
20th-century American politicians